Giovanni Zefra (died 1504) was a Roman Catholic prelate who served as Bishop of Alife (1486–1504).

Biography
On 6 September 1486, Giovanni Zefra was appointed Bishop of Alife by Pope Innocent VIII.
He served as Bishop of Alife until his death in 1504.

See also 
Catholic Church in Italy

References

External links and additional sources
 (for Chronology of Bishops) 
 (for Chronology of Bishops) 

15th-century Italian Roman Catholic bishops
16th-century Italian Roman Catholic bishops
Bishops appointed by Pope Innocent VIII
1504 deaths